Xpress Motorsports was a NASCAR Craftsman Truck Series team. The team won the Truck Series championship in 2002 and 2003 with Mike Bliss and Travis Kvapil, respectively. The team was owned by Steve Coulter until 2004, when he sold the team to then team manager Dave Fuge, who owned the team until 2007 when the team was sold to J. B. Scott. In late 2009 the team was again sold to Sprint Cup Series driver Kyle Busch.

Beginnings 
Xpress was formed in 1996, when Coulter founded the team to promote his company, IWX Motor Freight. Randy Tolsma was hired to drive the No. 61 Chevrolet Silverado at Phoenix, and finished 29th after an early crash. Tolsma was named the team's full-time driver in 1997, but only qualified for one-third of the first nine races of the season. Dave Fuge was hired as Crew Chief to rebuild the team and  they rebounded to capture his first career win at Mesa Marin Raceway. The team continued to run in 1998 with Tolsma driving and had ten top-tens and one pole position when they announced they were closing down their truck team at the end of the season to run the Busch Series. Tolsma left after 22 races, and they switched to the No. 61, fielding entries for Rick McCray, Stan Boyd, Blake Bainridge.

They began running the Busch Series with the No. 61 Pontiac Grand Prix in 1998, fielding one race apiece for Derrike Cope and Joe Pezza. Cope qualified for three out of four races and had a best finish of fifteenth in 1999 before he was replaced by rookie driver Tony Roper. Roper posted three top-tens in sixteen starts but departed the team near the end of the season. Robert Pressley, Morgan Shepherd, and Stanton Barrett drove the car for the rest of the season, with Shepherd posting a tenth-place finish at North Carolina Motor Speedway. Hut Stricklin was hired as the team's driver for the 2000 season and opened the year with a pole 
at the NAPA Auto Parts 300 but was released ten races into the season. After Darrell Lanigan ran a one-race deal at Lowe's Motor Speedway, they did not run until the Brickyard 400 Winston Cup race, when they failed to qualify with Rich Bickle driving. They returned to Busch at the end of the season, when Tim Sauter joined them with sponsorship from Stoops Freightliner. His best finish was fifteenth at Homestead-Miami Speedway.

Rebirth 
Sauter was named the team's permanent driver in 2001 and competed for NASCAR Rookie of the Year honors with Xpress, which was running Pontiacs and Chevrolets. After crew chief Dave Fuge was fined for a rules violation following the Outback Steakhouse 300 at Kentucky, the team closed its doors immediately and stopped running. Later in the season, Fuge decided to revive the team, and ran a one-race deal with Mike Bliss at South Boston Speedway, where he finished ninth.

Without the guarantee of funding from Coulter, Xpress decided to make a full-time run with Mike Bliss in 2002. They won five races and the Truck Series championship. In addition, they fielded a second entry for the first time in team history at the Ford 200, with Ron Hornaday Jr. winning in the team's No. 11 entry. Bliss moved to the Busch Series for 2003 and Travis Kvapil joined Xpress from Addington Racing. Kvapil won just one race that season and had already announced he was departing the team for Bang! Racing in 2004 when he won the championship at the season-finale at Homestead, giving Xpress its second consecutive title.

Three-time champion Jack Sprague, who had driven the No. 11 in two races in 2003, joined the team full-time in 2004 with Chevy Trucks coming on as a full-time backer. Sprague won the inaugural UAW/GM Ohio 250 and finished seventh in points. In 2005, Coulter sold the team to Fuge, and Xpress attempted to field the No. 19 truck in addition to the No. 16 with rookie Regan Smith driving, but the team dissolved after three races. Sprague won at Texas Motor Speedway, but left the team near the end of the season, and Bliss finished the rest of the year for the team, finishing fourth at Homestead. He ran with Xpress full-time with decreased support from Chevy, picking up a win at Atlanta Motor Speedway.

Xpress switched to the Ford F-150 and began a variety of drivers racing in the 2007 season. Stacy Compton, Kelly Bires, Kenny Hendrick, Scott Lagasse Jr., Chris Fontaine, Mike Bliss, and Derrike Cope all raced 16, with Hendrick making the most starts. Travis Kittleson drove the second No. 19 truck at O'Reilly Raceway Park, but finished last. In September 2007, J. B. and Brian Scott bought a majority interest of the team, with Brian Scott driving the remaining races except for Talladega, as Scott had not been approved by NASCAR to run superspeedways. Cope ran in his place. Scott was to run for Rookie of the Year in the Trucks in 2008 with sponsorship from Shark Energy Drink and Albertson's. However, Shark Energy ended its program with Xpress and Fitz Motorsports in March 2008. On September 2, it was announced that Xpress would enter a technological allegiance with Bill Davis Racing and switching manufacturers to Toyota starting at the Qwik Liner Las Vegas 350. Scott scored five top tens in the final seven races of that year and won his first race at Dover in 2009. In 2009 the team was sold again to become Kyle Busch Motorsports.

References

External links 
Shop Tour: Xpress Motorsports

1996 establishments in the United States
American auto racing teams
Defunct NASCAR teams
Auto racing teams disestablished in 2009
2009 disestablishments in North Carolina